Watier's Club was a gentlemen's Club established in 1807 and disbanded in 1819. It was located at 81 Piccadilly on the corner of Bolton Street in west London.

Prior to its occupation as a gaming hall and restaurant, it was a private residence, and the headquarters of a small singing club. The Prince of Wales suggested the creation of a club using his new chef, Jean-Baptiste Watier, whom the club was named after. Amongst the members in the early days were Henry Mildmay, Baron Alvanley, Beau Brummell and Henry Pierrepont.

It was at the behest of the Prince Regent, (later King George IV), that Brummell was named the club's president. As one biographer put it,

The game "Macao", referenced above, was a precursor of the French card game, baccarat. The club carried the affectionate nickname, "The Dandies Club," which was bestowed by Lord Byron who remarked, "I like the dandies, they were always very civil to me."

The club had a short life, eventually closing in 1819. It had become the haven for 'blackguards' and fortunes were being lost to a 'common bank' that had been set up by a group of members and guaranteed ruin for others.

References 

 

Regency London
Gentlemen's clubs in London